Events in the year 1954 in Bulgaria.

Incumbents 

 General Secretaries of the Bulgarian Communist Party: Valko Chervenkov (from 1949 until March 4) Todor Zhivkov (from March 4 until 1989)
 Chairmen of the Council of Ministers: Valko Chervenkov

Events 

 The Ministry of Culture of Bulgaria became its own separate institution.

Sports 

 FC Ravda 1954, a Bulgarian football club from the village of Ravda (near the city Nesebar), was established.

References 

 
1950s in Bulgaria
Years of the 20th century in Bulgaria
Bulgaria
Bulgaria